is a Japanese voice actor and singer from Kanagawa Prefecture, Japan. He is currently affiliated with 81 Produce. His major roles are Atsushi Kinugawa in Cute High Earth Defense Club Love!, Sakutaro Kirara in Jewelpet: Magical Change, Kazunori Uesugi in Tantei Team KZ Jiken Note, Yoshiharu Hisomu in Kiznaiver and Ryūichi Kashima in School Babysitters. In 2018, he won the Best New Actor Award at the 12th Seiyu Awards.

Biography 
Nishiyama wanted to work using his voice since his 6th year of elementary school; in junior high school, he was suggested by a friend to become a voice actor. During high school, he participated in the Creative Course (which included voice actor and broadcast major) of his school. In 2009, while in high school, he participated in NHK's nationwide high school broadcast competition.

In 2009, he participated in the 3rd 81 Audition and won a special award, after which he entered 81 Produce's training school. In May 2011, he joined the company 81 Produce. In 2015, he launched the entertainment group "Ooimachi Cream Soda" along with Reona Irie and Yuu Taniguchi. As part of Ooimachi Cream Soda, Nishiyama also acts in various stage plays.

In 2016, Nishiyama released his first personal book Nishiyama-san Chi no Koutaro-kun. In 2017, he published a photo essay book Tarorizumu. In 2018, he won the Best New Actor Award at the 12th Seiyuu Awards. Nishiyama shared the award with Taku Yashiro and Shun Horie.

In 2020, Nishiyama made his debut as singer from Lantis with mini album CITY.

Filmography

Anime

Video games

Drama CD

Dubbing

Variety shows

Publications

Photobooks

Discography

Extended plays

Awards

References

External links 

  
 Official agency profile 
 

1991 births
Living people
Japanese male video game actors
Japanese male voice actors
Male voice actors from Kanagawa Prefecture
21st-century Japanese male actors
81 Produce voice actors